Sir Reginald Francis Douce Palgrave  (28 June 1829 – 13 July 1904) was a British civil servant who was Clerk of the House of Commons.

Life
Reginald Palgrave was born in Westminster, London, the fourth son of Francis Palgrave (born Cohen) and his wife Elizabeth Turner, daughter of banker Dawson Turner.  His brothers were Francis Turner Palgrave, William Gifford Palgrave, and Inglis Palgrave.  He became a solicitor in 1851; but two years later was appointed a clerk in the House of Commons, becoming clerk of the House on the retirement of Sir Erskine May in 1886. He married Grace Battley, daughter of Richard Battley, in 1857. He was made a Companion of the Order of the Bath (C.B.) in the 1887 Golden Jubilee Honours and advanced to Knight Commander of the Order of Bath (K.C.B.) in 1892, and retired from his office in January 1900. He died in Salisbury in 1904.

Works
The Chairman's Handbook; The House of Commons: Illustrations of its History and Practice (London, 1869)
Cromwell: an appreciation based on contemporary evidence (London, 1890)
Palgrave also helped to edit the tenth edition of Erskine May's Treatise on the Law, Privileges, Proceedings and Usage of Parliament (London, 1893).

References

 Biography and Genealogy Master Index. Farmington Hills, Mich.: Gale, Cengage Learning. 1980- 2009.

Notes

Attribution

External links

1829 births
1904 deaths
English people of Jewish descent
Clerks of the House of Commons
Knights Commander of the Order of the Bath
People educated at Charterhouse School